Florian Michel (born 25 March 1992) is a French professional footballer who plays as a midfielder for Championnat National 3 club Bourgoin-Jallieu.

Club career
A youth product of Grenoble Foot 38 since he was 12, Michel left Grenoble for Bourgoin-Jallieu in 2015. He returned to Grenoble on 6 June 2019. He made his professional debut with the club in a 1–0 Ligue 2 loss to Ajaccio on 2 August 2019.

On 26 January 2023, Michel returned to Bourgoin-Jallieu.

References

External links
 
 GF38 Profile
 Foot-National Profile

1992 births
People from Saint-Martin-d'Hères
Sportspeople from Isère
Footballers from Auvergne-Rhône-Alpes
Living people
French footballers
Association football midfielders
Grenoble Foot 38 players
FC Bourgoin-Jallieu players
Ligue 2 players
Championnat National 2 players
Championnat National 3 players